Dennis L. Serrette was the New Alliance Party candidate for United States President in the 1984 presidential election. As a presidential candidate, his running mate was Nancy Ross. Serrette would split with the party after the election.

Biography 
Serrette was born in Harlem, New York in the 1940s. Serrette has been a union activist since 1964, and was a founding member of the Communication Workers of America (CWA) Black Caucus in 1971. In 1972 he became a founding member of the Coalition of Black Trade Unionists.  He was also a vice president of a local of the CWA and is currently the CWA's Education Specialist. At present, he is also the president of the United Association for Labor Education.

Dennis Serrette was first recruited as a presidential candidate by the Consumer Party of Pennsylvania's chairman, Max Weiner. He was later recruited by Peter Diamondstone, chairman of the Liberty Union Party of Vermont. As a longtime activist and trade unionist he led struggles in the Harlem community against the closing of Sydenham Hospital, chaired the Committee to save the Schomburg Center for Research in Black Culture, and as Vice President of Local 1101 led the longest and most militant strike against the New York Telephone company, which lasted seven months (July 14, 1971 through February 16, 1972).

References
 United Association for Labor Education Organizational Structure
 "Coalition of Black Trade Unionists Honors Two CWA Activist" CWA News July 1, 2001
 "Commentary: ‘I gotcha back, bro’" The Guild Reporter November 15, 2002
 Dennis L. Serrette, "Inside the New Alliance Party (aka Rainbow Alliance aka Rainbow Lobby aka the Organization a/k/a)"

1940s births
Living people
People from Harlem
Candidates in the 1984 United States presidential election
20th-century American politicians
African-American candidates for President of the United States
African-American trade unionists
New Alliance Party (United States) politicians
Trade unionists from New York (state)
20th-century African-American politicians
21st-century African-American people